Phaleria bimaculata is a species of darkling beetles belonging to the family Tenebrionidae.

Subspecies
 Phaleria bimaculata adriatica Rey, 1891 
 Phaleria bimaculata bimaculata (Linnaeus, 1767) 
 Phaleria bimaculata pontica Semenov, 1901

Description
Usually head is dark brown, pronotum is brown, while elytrae are pale brown with two large dark brown spots. These small beetles show a high degree of inter-population morphological variability.

Distribution and habitat
This species is present in most of Europe. These darkling beetles live in sandy beaches.

References

Tenebrionidae
Beetles of Europe
Beetles described in 1767
Taxa named by Carl Linnaeus